Saint Veronica, also known as Berenike, was a woman from Jerusalem who lived in the 1st century AD, according to extra-biblical Christian sacred tradition. A celebrated saint in many pious Christian countries, the 17th-century Acta Sanctorum published by the Bollandists listed her feast under July 12, but the German Jesuit scholar Joseph Braun cited her commemoration in Festi Marianni on 13 January.

According to Church tradition, Veronica was moved with sympathy seeing Jesus carrying the cross to Calvary and gave him her veil so that he could wipe his forehead. Jesus accepted the offer, and when he returned the veil the image of his face was miraculously captured on it. The resulting relic  became known as the Veil of Veronica.

The story of Veronica is celebrated in the sixth Station of the Cross in many Anglican, Catholic, and Western Orthodox churches.

Background

There is no reference to the story of Veronica and her veil in the canonical gospels. The closest is the miracle of the unnamed woman who was healed by touching the hem of Jesus’s garment. The apocryphal Gospel of Nicodemus gives her name as Berenikē or Beronike. The name Veronica is a Latinisation of this ancient Macedonian name. The story was later elaborated in the 11th century by adding that Christ gave her a portrait of himself on a cloth, with which she later cured the Emperor Tiberius. The linking of this with the bearing of the cross in the Passion occurs only around 1380 in the internationally popular book Meditations on the life of Christ.

At some point a relic became associated with the story. Pedro Tafur, a Spanish knight visiting Rome in 1436, describes the following in the Church of St. Peter in his 1454 travel account:

However, he does not say specifically that he witnessed for himself this exhibition of the relic.

Some academic sources suggest a different origin for the legend of St. Veronica: that the cloth bearing an image of Jesus's face was known in Latin as the vera icon ("true image"), and that this name for the relic was misinterpreted as the name of a saint. The Catholic Encyclopedia of 1913 writes:

The reference to Abgar is related to a similar legend in the Eastern Church, the Image of Edessa or Mandylion.

The Encyclopædia Britannica says this about the legend:

Veronica was mentioned in the reported visions of Jesus by Marie of St Peter, a Carmelite nun who lived in Tours, France, and started the devotion to the Holy Face of Jesus. In 1844, Sister Marie reported that in a vision, she saw Veronica wiping away the spit and mud from the face of Jesus with her veil on the way to Calvary. She said that sacrilegious and blasphemous acts today are adding to the spit and mud that Veronica wiped away that day. According to Marie of St Peter, in her visions, Jesus told her that he desired devotion to His Holy Face in reparation for sacrilege and blasphemy. Acts of Reparation to Jesus Christ are thus compared to Veronica wiping the face of Jesus.

The Devotion to the Holy Face of Jesus was eventually approved by Pope Leo XIII in 1885. Veronica is commemorated on 12 July.

Official patronage 
Saint Veronica is the patron of the French mulquiniers whose representations they celebrated biannually (summer and winter) as in many pious Christian countries. She is also the patron saint of photographers, and laundry workers.

In popular culture 

In Volume 5 of her work, The Poem of the Man-God, Italian writer and alleged mystic Maria Valtorta depicts Veronica as Nike, who offered the linen cloth to Christ. It is also stated earlier in the same volume that "The one we call Veronica and whom Jesus called Nike..." suggesting that Nike has been mistakenly referred to as Veronica throughout history.

Selma Lagerlöf in Christ Legends expands the legend by making Veronica a former servant of the Roman emperor Tiberius, named Faustina, who travels to Jerusalem in search of the Prophet of Nazareth, after learning that he once cured a young woman of leprosy. She travels on behalf of Tiberius, now himself stricken,  hoping to bring him a cure and redemption from his evil ways.  Faustina arrives on the day of the Crucifixion, and the rest is legend.

Mel Gibson's film The Passion of the Christ (2004) included an episode of Veronica wiping Jesus's face, although she is not referred to by name in the film (she is credited in the film as Seraphia). Anne Catherine Emmerich, one of the inspirational sources to the cited movie, depicts a long description of the Veronica episode and she identifies the true name of Veronica also as Seraphia.

The most common pass with the cape in bullfighting is called a verónica, as the torero holds the cape in the same way as Veronica is usually depicted holding the cloth.

The song "Climb" by Tori Amos on her 2017 album Native Invader contains repeated references to Veronica.

Veronica is portrayed by Zhaleh Vossough in the third season of the television series The Chosen. Disowned by her family and socially shunned due to her bleeding, she is healed by believing that touching Jesus' garment can heal her.

See also 
 Acheiropoieta
 Jesus healing the bleeding woman
 List of names for the biblical nameless
 Relics associated with Jesus
 Scapular of the Holy Face
 Veronica's Veil
 Matthew 9
 Mark 5

References

External links 

 Catholic Online - Saints & Angels: St Veronica

1st-century births
1st-century Christian female saints
1st-century deaths
Saints from the Holy Land
Stations of the Cross